The Diamond Jo Casino is a gambling casino and entertainment complex located in the Port of Dubuque, in Dubuque, Iowa. The casino is owned and operated by Las Vegas-based Boyd Gaming, which also owns the Diamond Jo Casino - Worth in Northwood, Iowa. It is a member of the Iowa Gaming Association, and its license is held by the Dubuque Racing Association, which operates Q Casino. Beginning operations on May 18, 1994, the Diamond Jo was a 3-level, 1,500-passenger vessel in Dubuque's Ice Harbor. The boat was a dockside that did not cruise, the casino became land-based when its new facility opened December 11, 2008.

The Diamond Jo Casino is located at 301 Bell Street, in the rapidly developing Port of Dubuque. The casino, along with the nearby National Mississippi River Museum & Aquarium and other attractions, have helped to create a large and growing tourism market in Dubuque.

Riverboat casino
It has 777 slot, keno, and video poker games, and 17 table games, including: Big Raise Hold 'em, Blackjack, Craps, Four card poker, Let It Ride, Roulette, Texas Hold 'em, and Three card poker. The operation had 3 restaurants: the Diamond Deli, HighSteaks Restaurant, and Jo's Café.

History
On April 1, 1991, the Dubuque Racing Association (DRA) and local businessman Robert Kehl opened Iowa's first riverboat casino in Dubuque's Ice Harbor, the Casino Belle. This boat's operation was short-lived, however, and relocated to Missouri in 1993, following a change in ownership.

Soon after, the DRA began to search for a new riverboat to operate under the gaming license already in place. The organization selected the Greater Dubuque Riverboat Entertainment Company L.C., and its boat, which was later named the Diamond Jo, following a local naming contest. The name honors businessman Joseph "Diamond Jo" Reynolds, who owned a Dubuque shipping company, among other enterprises. The "first" Diamond Jo Casino began operations on May 18, 1994. After a year and a half, in October 1995, that boat was replaced with a larger, 1,500-passenger riverboat.

In July 1999, Dubuque-based Peninsula Gaming purchased the casino operation, and spent $1 million updating the riverboat. Peninsula Gaming continues to operate the casino. In 2006, Peninsula opened a second Diamond Jo Casino in Northwood, Iowa,  from Dubuque. Peninsula was acquired in November 2012 by Boyd Gaming.

Expansion
In September 2006, Peninsula Gaming officials announced that the Diamond Jo would begin a major expansion, during which it would become a land-based casino. The $75 million project, set to open in November 2008, will include 1,000 slot machines, 17 table games, and a poker room in a new  casino. Also included in the project are a 36-lane bowling & entertainment center, 3 restaurants, retail stores, and a 1,130-space, $23 million parking ramp.

The casino's expanded operation is part of the "America's River Project: Phase II", which will also involve a major expansion of the National Mississippi River Museum & Aquarium. The museum will take over the Diamond Jo's existing Portside Building, as well as the riverboat, and renovate them into an IMAX-like theater and exhibit space.

Land-based casino complex
The land-based complex, which is a short distance away from the old casino property, opened on December 11, 2008. The new, two-story, $82 million facility has approximately 900 slot and video machines, 17 table games, and a separate high-stakes gaming area.  The Diamond Jo complex features three sitdown restaurants (The Woodfire Grille, The Filament and Kitchen Buffet), two bars (the Tree Bar and The Game Sports Bar), a 30 lane bowling alley (Cherry Lanes) with scheduled leagues, and an entertainment theatre complex (The Mississippi Moon Bar).

Mississippi Moon Bar
The Mississippi Moon Bar was named after the refrain in the Doobie Brothers song "Black Water", which the casino uses in their current commercial campaign. The Doobie Brothers were also one of the first groups to perform at the bar.

References

External links

Casinos in Iowa
Buildings and structures in Dubuque, Iowa
Economy of Dubuque, Iowa
Tourist attractions in Dubuque, Iowa
Boyd Gaming
2008 establishments in Iowa